Good cop, bad cop is a psychological tactic used in interrogation and negotiation, in which a team of two people take opposing approaches to the subject. One interrogator adopts a hostile or accusatory demeanor, emphasizing threats of punishment, while the other adopts a more sympathetic demeanor, emphasizing reward, in order to convince the subject to cooperate. It is an instance of the Reid technique.

Technique
The "bad cop" takes an aggressive, negative stance towards the subject, making blatant accusations, derogatory comments, threats, and in general creating antipathy with the subject. This sets the stage for the "good cop" to act sympathetically, appearing supportive and understanding, and in general showing sympathy for the subject. The good cop defends the subject from the bad cop. The subject may feel able to cooperate with the good cop, either out of trust or out of fear of the bad cop and may then seek protection by the good cop and provide the information the interrogators are seeking.  When this technique is used as a negotiation tactic outside of the interrogation context, the good cop will attempt to convince the subject to cut a deal and threaten to bring the bad cop back if no deal is forthcoming. The order can also be reversed. When performed in this manner, the good cop does most of the talking and the bad cop intervenes only to soften up the subject and make them crack under pressure.

The disadvantage of this technique is that it can be easily identified, and the "bad cop" may alienate the subject.

See also
False confession
Carrot and stick
Officer Friendly, a good-cop character used to promote police to children

References

External links

Deception
Interrogation techniques
Law enforcement techniques
Stock characters
Psychological manipulation
Dichotomies